Édgar Negret (October 11, 1920 – October 11, 2012) was a Colombian abstract sculptor.

Life
Negret was born in Popayán, Colombia. He attended the School of Fine Arts in Cali, Colombia, where he started his first studies in the year 1938 with the founder and teacher Jesus Maria Espinosa.
Initially working in stone in styles reminiscent of European modernists like Jean Arp and Constantin Brâncuși.
By the early 1950s, he began working in metal in constructivist tradition.

In 1955, his art was acquired by the Museum of Modern Art.
In 1963, he won the Salón de Artistas Colombianos, and therein became one of the most prominent Colombian sculptors of the 20th century. In 1968, he was awarded the David E. Bright Sculpture Prize, at the Thirty-fourth Venice Biennial.
In 1985, the Museum Negret opened.
In 2010, he was awarded “Grado de Oficial” by order of the Congress of Colombia.
Negret died, on his 92nd birthday, in Bogotá, Colombia.

In 2016, Google Doodle commemorated his 96th birthday.

Selected works
El Maíz

References

External links

"Interview: EDGARD NEGRET", Mario Pachajoa Burbano, Septiembre 15, 1999
Colombia.com - EDGAR NEGRET  (Artista Plástico)
"Edgar Negret", La Prenza Libre, 10/08/10

1920 births
2012 deaths
Modern sculptors
Colombian sculptors
People from Cauca Department